José Renan Vasconcelos Calheiros Filho (born December 8, 1979) is a Brazilian economist and politician. He is a former governor of Alagoas, who served from January 2015 to April 2022. He is affiliated with the Brazilian Democratic Movement.

He was elected mayor of the municipality of Murici, Alagoas, in the 2004 election, and was re-elected in 2008. In early April 2010, he resigned to possibly play a state office of Member of the Legislative Assembly, replaced by Remi Calheiros, former mayor and who was his deputy.

In the elections of October 2010 he was elected Congressman, and that election the most voted candidate of Alagoas. was the one who received the most votes in 22 of the 104 Alagoas state municipalities.

He is the son of the previous president of the Senate, Renan Calheiros, and Maria Veronica Rodrigues Calheiros.

In October 2014, he was elected in the first round governor of Alagoas with 52.16% of the votes.

References

|-

Living people
1979 births
Governors of Alagoas
Brazilian economists
Members of the Chamber of Deputies (Brazil) from Alagoas
Brazilian Democratic Movement politicians
Mayors of places in Brazil
Government ministers of Brazil